Beaufort Executive Airport  is a county-owned, public-use airport in Beaufort County, South Carolina, United States. It is also known as Frogmore Intranational Airport.

This airport is included in the National Plan of Integrated Airport Systems for 2021–2025, which categorized it as a general aviation facility.

Although many U.S. airports use the same three-letter location identifier for the FAA and IATA, this airport is assigned ARW by the FAA and BFT by the IATA (which assigned ARW to Arad Airport in Arad, Romania)

Facilities and aircraft 

For the 12-month period ending 3 July 2018, the airport had 18,000 aircraft operations, on average 49 per day: 97.4% general aviation and 2.6% air taxi. At that time there were 36 aircraft based at this airport: 81% single-engine, 8% multi-engine, and 11% helicopter.

Cargo airlines

References

External links 
 Beaufort Executive Airport at Beaufort County website
 

Airports in South Carolina
Buildings and structures in Beaufort County, South Carolina
Transportation in Beaufort County, South Carolina